Parlier is a city in Fresno County, California, United States. As of the 2010 census, the city had a total population of 14,494, up from 11,145 in 2000. The city has one of the state's highest percentage of Latinos, a large majority of whom are seasonal migrant laborers who arrive and temporarily work in the area's agricultural sector.

Geography 

History and culture
In 1876, the I.N. Parlier family migrated from Springfield, Illinois to the present site of Parlier. The family's name, and city's namesake, was derived from DeParlier, their French ancestry. The Parlier family's general store, trading post and post office became the center of town. Small, family-run wheat farms were initially cultivated in the area. Wheat soon gave way to grapes, raisins and tree fruit, foods that Parlier continues to produce. Improved irrigation systems and arrival of the railroad helped Parlier establish itself as a hub among surrounding communities.

Public schools
Parlier has four elementary schools, one junior high school, and one high school. In addition, there is a preschool and Head Start program, as well as continuing education.

Demographics

2010
At the 2010 census Parlier had a population of 14,494. The racial makeup of Parlier was 7,251 (50.0%) White, 85 (0.6%) African American, 180 (1.2%) Native American, 77 (0.5%) Asian, 9 (0.1%) Pacific Islander, 6,387 (44.1%) from other races, and 505 (3.5%) from two or more races. Hispanic or Latino of any race were 14,137 persons (97.5%).

The census reported that 14,492 people (100% of the population) lived in households, 2 (0%) lived in non-institutionalized group quarters, and no one was institutionalized.

There were 3,297 households, 2,276 (69.0%) had children under the age of 18 living in them, 1,950 (59.1%) were opposite-sex married couples living together, 662 (20.1%) had a female householder with no husband present, 339 (10.3%) had a male householder with no wife present.  There were 288 (8.7%) unmarried opposite-sex partnerships, and 31 (0.9%) same-sex married couples or partnerships. 239 households (7.2%) were one person and 107 (3.2%) had someone living alone who was 65 or older. The average household size was 4.40.  There were 2,951 families (89.5% of households); the average family size was 4.46.

The age distribution was 5,378 people (37.1%) under the age of 18, 1,841 people (12.7%) aged 18 to 24, 4,103 people (28.3%) aged 25 to 44, 2,375 people (16.4%) aged 45 to 64, and 797 people (5.5%) who were 65 or older.  The median age was 25.1 years. For every 100 females, there were 104.9 males.  For every 100 females age 18 and over, there were 106.3 males.

The homeowner vacancy rate was 1.3%; the rental vacancy rate was 3.7%.  6,936 people (47.9% of the population) lived in owner-occupied housing units and 7,556 people (52.1%) lived in rental housing units.

2000
At the 2000 census, there were 11,145 people in 2,446 households, including 2,179 families, in the city.  The population density was 6,862.9 inhabitants per square mile (2,656.2/km2).  There were 2,644 housing units at an average density of 630.2 inhabitants/km2 (1,628.1 inhabitants/mi2).  The racial makeup of the city was 33.63% White, 0.58% African American, 1.94% Native American, 0.82% Asian, 0.04% Pacific Islander, 59.43% from other races, and 3.56% from two or more races.  96.97% of the population were Hispanic or Latino of any race.

There were 2,446 households, 61.9% had children under the age of 18 living with them, 62.8% were married couples living together, 17.9% had a female householder with no husband present, and 10.9% were non-families. 6.8% of households were made up of individuals, and 3.7% had someone living alone who was 65 or older.  The average household size was 4.51 and the average family size was 4.59.

The age distribution was 37.9% under the age of 18, 14.3% from 18 to 24, 29.7% from 25 to 44, 13.2% from 45 to 64, and 4.9% who were 65 or older.  The median age was 24 years.  For every 100 females, there were 108.6 males.  For every 100 females age 18 and over, there were 112.5 males.

The median income for a household in the city was $24,539, and the median family income was $24,275. Males had a median income of $16,585 versus $17,589 for females. The per capita income for the city was $7,078.  36.0% of the population and 33.5% of families were below the poverty line.  Out of the total people living in poverty, 42.9% were under the age of 18 and 18.6% were 65 or older.

Notable people
Red Adams, baseball player and pitching coach for the Los Angeles Dodgers
Vern Mikkelsen, NBA Hall of Famer, was born in Parlier

Sister cities 
  Ensenada, Mexico

References

External links

Incorporated cities and towns in California
Cities in Fresno County, California
Populated places established in 1921
1921 establishments in California
Chicano and Mexican neighborhoods in California